Sherton Heights  is a populated place located in Scott County at latitude 41.593 and longitude -90.427.

Geography
Sherton Heights is located at  (41.593, -90.427).

References

External links

Populated places in Scott County, Iowa